Dulling Occams Razor is the only EP by the American extreme metal band Found Dead Hanging before changing their name to  Architect.  It was released along with Bare As Bones by Backstabbers Incorporated and Deadwater Drowning by Deadwater Drowning as the inaugural releases of Black Market Activities on July 15, 2003.

In philosophy, Occam's Razor is the meta-theoretical principle that the simplest solution is usually the correct one.

Track listing

References 

2003 EPs
Black Market Activities EPs